Chevalier  Jean Baptiste Vérany (1800, in Nice – 1865) was a French pharmacist and naturalist who specialised in the study of cephalopods.

In 1846, with Jean-Baptiste Barla (1817–1896), he founded the Muséum d'histoire naturelle de Nice. Vérany discovered and described many species. André Étienne d'Audebert de Férussac named Chiroteuthis veranyi for him.

See also

:Category:Taxa named by Jean Baptiste Vérany

Works
Partial list:
 1842 – Illustrations. Isis von Oken, pp. 252–253.
 1844 – Description de deux genres nouveaux de mollusques nudibranches. Revue Zoologique par la Societe Cuvierienne, pp. 302–303.
 1845 – Janus spinolae. Guerin Magazin de Zoologie, series 2, 7:121-122, pl. 136.
 1846 – Descrizione di Genova e del Genovesato 1(2): Regno Animale Molluschi, pp. 90–110, pls. 2-4.
 1846 – Catalogo degli animali invertebrati marini del golfo di Genova e Nizza. Est. dulla Guida di Genova 3: 1-30
 1849 – Description d'un nouveau genre et d'une nouvelle espece de Mollusque. Revue et Magazin de Zoologie pure et appliquee (2), 1:593-594, pl. 17.
 1850 – Lomanotus, eine neue Gattung und Art Molluske. Tagsberichte uber die Fortschritte der Natur- und Heilkunde, Abth. fur zoologie und palaeontologie 1(16):89-96.
 1853 – Catalogue des Mollusques cephalopodes, pteropodes, Gasteropodes nudibranches, etc. des environs de Nice. Journal de Conchyliologie 4:375-392.
 1862 – Zoologie des Alpes-Maritimes. Statistique générale du département par J. Roux.
 1862 – Zoologie des Alpes-Maritimes ou catalogue des animaux observes dans la département, Nice, Imprimerie et Librairie Ch. Cauvin, pp. 1–102. Nudibranchia pp. 86–90.
 1851 – Céphalopodes de la Méditerranée. Mollusques Méditerranéens Observes, Decrits, Figures et Chromolithographies a apres le vivant ouvrage dedii ASM le roi Charles Albert, I:1-132.
 1865 – Notice sur les Mollusques Nudibranches et description des six nouvelles Eolides de la Mediterranee. Annales de la Societe des Lettres, Sciences et Arts des Alpes-Maritimes 1:241-252.

External links
 
 
 Images from the classic monograph by Jean-Baptiste Vernay
 Article on Vérany's illustrations of cephalopods

French zoologists
French pharmacists
1800 births
1865 deaths
Teuthologists